Frank T. "Nick" Nickell (born 1947) is an American bridge player. He graduated from the University of North Carolina, and lived in Raleigh, North Carolina, as of 1994.

Nickell was inducted into the ACBL Hall of Fame in 2008. At the time he lived in New York City and led the private equity investment firm Kelso & Company. 

Nickell has created one of the most dominant bridge teams of all time, winning four world championships and multiple North American Bridge Championships. He formed a successful partnership with Richard Freeman until Freeman's death and has since partnered with Ralph Katz. He has won both team events and pair events.

Nickell is an ACBL Grand Life Master.

Bridge accomplishments

Honors

 ACBL Hall of Fame, 2008

Awards

 Fishbein Trophy (1) 1995

Wins

 Bermuda Bowl (4) 1995, 1999, 2003, 2009
 North American Bridge Championships (24)
 von Zedtwitz Life Master Pairs (2) 2003, 2022 
 Blue Ribbon Pairs (1) 1991 
 Vanderbilt (4) 2000, 2003, 2014, 2017
 Reisinger (7) 1993, 1994, 1995, 2004, 2005, 2008, 2009 
 Spingold (9) 1993, 1994, 1995, 1996, 1998, 1999, 2004, 2006, 2007 
 Senior Knockout Teams (1) 2016
 United States Bridge Championships (9)
  Open Team Trials (9) 1998, 2001, 2002, 2004, 2007, 2008, 2012, 2014, 2017

Runners-up

 Bermuda Bowl (2) 1997, 2005
 North American Bridge Championships (15)
 Grand National Teams (1) 1983 
 Vanderbilt (4) 1996, 2002, 2018, 2019 
 Mitchell Board-a-Match Teams (3) 1998, 1999, 2012 
 Spingold (2) 2011, 2012 
 Roth Open Swiss Teams (2) 2015, 2018 
 Senior Knockout Teams (2) 2017, 2018 
 Reisinger (1) 2014
 United States Bridge Championships (1)
  Open Team Trials (1) 1997

References

External links
 
 
 ACBL NABC Winners -Nick Nickell

1947 births
American contract bridge players
Bermuda Bowl players
University of North Carolina alumni
People from Raleigh, North Carolina
Sportspeople from New York City
Living people
Place of birth missing (living people)
Date of birth missing (living people)